Joydeep Banik (born 25 February 1993) is an Indian cricketer. He made his List A debut for Tripura in the 2016–17 Vijay Hazare Trophy on 6 March 2017. He made his first-class debut for Tripura in the 2018–19 Ranji Trophy on 14 December 2018. He made his Twenty20 debut for Tripura in the 2018–19 Syed Mushtaq Ali Trophy on 21 February 2019.

References

External links
 

1993 births
Living people
Indian cricketers
Tripura cricketers
Place of birth missing (living people)